The 2014–15 South-West Indian Ocean cyclone season was an above average event in tropical cyclone formation. It began on November 15, 2014, and ended on April 30, 2015, with the exception for Mauritius and the Seychelles, for which it ended on May 15, 2015. These dates conventionally delimit the period of each year when most tropical and subtropical cyclones form in the basin, which is west of 90°E and south of the Equator. Tropical and subtropical cyclones in this basin are monitored by the Regional Specialised Meteorological Centre in Réunion.



Seasonal summary

During October 2014, the Mauritius Meteorological Services issued its seasonal outlook for the summer of 2014–15 and predicted that between ten and twelve named storms would develop during the season. The first tropical disturbance of the season developed on November 16, and quickly developed into the first named storm of the season and was named Adjali by Mauritius. The last tropical storm of this season, Tropical Depression 14, that would be Ikola, strengthened to a Category 1 tropical cyclone before it crossed on the Australian basin the next day. 2 storms, Bansi and Eunice, became Very Intense Tropical Cyclones.

Systems

Severe Tropical Storm Adjali

An area of low pressure developed close to Diego Garcia on November 14. It slowly organized as it made a northwest–south-southeast loop over the next two days. By the evening of November 16, the center of the storm became more well defined with convective rainbands wrapped tightly into it. Around that time, RSMC La Réunion started tracking the system as a tropical disturbance, and subsequently upgraded it to a Tropical Depression. Later that day, the JTWC issued a Tropical Cyclone Formation Alert on the system. The depression strengthened further and became the first named tropical storm of the year. On the same day, Mauritius Meteorological Service, which usually names storms in the region, named the system Adjali. The JTWC also initiated advisories on Adjali. On November 17, MFR upgraded it to a Severe Tropical Storm. On November 20, Adjali turned west until reached the northern tip of Madagascar on November 23 and rapidly dissipated. It stayed well from land.

Tropical Depression 02

During November 25, RSMC La Réunion reported that Tropical Disturbance 2, had developed within a marginal environment for further development to the northeast of the Mascarene islands.

Intense Tropical Cyclone Kate

Very Intense Tropical Cyclone Bansi

On January 9, the MFR upgraded a low-pressure system east of Madagascar to a zone of disturbed weather, and the system became a tropical disturbance late on the next day. On January 11, the MFR upgraded the system to a tropical depression. Later that day, it intensified into a moderate tropical storm, receiving the name Bansi, whilst the JTWC upgraded it to a tropical storm. In the next day, the MFR upgraded Bansi to a tropical cyclone, as the system formed a ragged eye. On January 13, Bansi explosively intensified into a Category 5 cyclone. However, it soon weakened to a Category 2 on the SSHWS (intense tropical cyclone for MFR) due to an eyewall replacement cycle.

 Approximately 90 percent of the island was left without power as a result of the storm. Some flooding occurred and 115 people sought refuge in shelters. From this moment onwards it started weakening gradually at first, but then deteriorated quickly.

Severe Tropical Storm Chedza

The formative stages of Chedza brought rainfall to an already flooded region across southeastern Africa. Weeks of heavy rainfall killed 117 people in Mozambique and 104 in neighboring Malawi, where it was the worst floods in 24 years. In Madagascar, Chedza struck after weeks of heavy rainfall, causing rivers to increase and flooding widespread areas of crop fields. In the capital city of Antananarivo, the deluge damaged the main water pump that controlled water levels in the region. The rainfall caused mudslides and damaged roads. Across the country, flooding from Chedza displaced 54,792 people, after destroying 4,430 houses and flooding another 3,442, mostly in Vatovavy-Fitovinany in the southeastern portion. Chedza killed 80 people and caused about $40 million in damage (2015 USD). Later, the storm brought heavy rainfall and strong winds to the mountainous peaks of Réunion.

Moderate Tropical Storm Diamondra

Very Intense Tropical Cyclone Eunice

On January 27, RSMC La Réunion reported that Tropical Disturbance 08, had developed to the northeast of Mauritius.

Severe Tropical Storm Fundi

While in its formative stages, the storm brought rainfall to southwestern Madagascar, totaling  in Tulear. Severe floods impacted the city of Toliara, killing five people and affecting 1,200 homes. The effects of Fundi in Madagascar worsened the situation in areas still recovering from Severe Tropical Storm Chedza the previous month.

Severe Tropical Storm Glenda

 The disturbance continued to move in a westerly direction as the JTWC issued a Tropical Cyclone Formation Alert on the system. On February 24, the system gradually intensified into a tropical depression, whilst the JTWC upgraded it into a tropical storm. However, the MFR upgraded the depression into a moderate tropical storm, which was then named Glenda. It intensified slightly because of favourable conditions for further development, within moderate vertical wind shear. On February 25, the storm continued to intensify, and it reached peak intensity. It quickly weakened the next day, and continued to weaken on February 28, and it lost its energy on March 1. Thereafter, MFR announced their final advisory on the system soon after.

Tropical Depression 11

Moderate Tropical Storm Haliba

During the early stages of Haliba's development it produced heavy rains across eastern Madagascar, resulting in severe flooding. A total of 26 people lost their lives on the island while approximately 96,000 people were affected, 39,000 of whom were rendered homeless. Roughly 13,000 hectares (32,000 acres) of rice fields were destroyed. Torrential rains also affected Mauritius for three days, leading to damaging floods. While passing near Réunion, the cyclone produced torrential rain over the northern areas of the island. Although heavy, the rains were noted as normal for a tropical cyclone. Agricultural damage in the region amounted to €6 million (US$6.4 million).

Tropical Cyclone Joalane

On April 1, the MFR began to monitor Tropical Disturbance 13 several miles southeast of Diego Garcia. Post-storm analysis determined that it did not develop until April 2. Joalane rapidly intensified into a Tropical Cyclone strength system and reached peak intensity. Afterwards, Joalane kept strength while accelerating southward. Joalane became a remnant low late on April 11. The remnant low continued south until it degenerated to a trough by strong wind shear.

Severe Tropical Storm Ikola

Other systems
Early on December 13, Tropical Cyclone Bakung was a category 1 tropical cyclone on the Australian tropical cyclone intensity scale before entering this basin. As a result, TCWC Jakarta and the JTWC issued their final warnings on the system, while RSMC La Réunion declared it to be a remnant low in their first and only warning on the system.

Storm names
Within the South-West Indian Ocean, tropical depressions and subtropical depressions that are judged to have 10-minute sustained windspeeds of 65 km/h, (40 mph) by the Regional Specialized Meteorological Center on La Réunion Island, France (RSMC La Réunion) are usually assigned a name. However, it is the Sub-Regional Tropical Cyclone Advisory Centers in Mauritius and Madagascar who name the systems. The Sub-Regional Tropical Cyclone Advisory Center in Mauritius names the storm should it intensify into a moderate tropical storm between 55°E and 90°E, if the storm should intensify into a moderate tropical storm between 30°E and 55°E then the Sub-Regional Tropical Cyclone Advisory Center in Madagascar assigns the appropriate name to the storm. New name lists are used every year, while a name is normally only used once so there are currently no names are retired.

Of note is the presence of the name Nathan in this list. This is unrelated to Cyclone Nathan which coincidentally formed during the same cyclone season in the neighbouring Australian region.

Seasonal effects
This table lists all of the tropical cyclones and subtropical cyclones that were monitored during the 2014–2015 South-West Indian Ocean cyclone season. Information on their intensity, duration, name, areas affected, primarily comes from RSMC La Réunion. Death and damage reports come from either press reports or the relevant national disaster management agency while the damage totals are given in 2014 or 2015 USD.

|-
|  ||  || bgcolor=#| || bgcolor=#| || bgcolor=#| || None || None || None ||
|-
|  ||  || bgcolor=#| || bgcolor=#| || bgcolor=#| || Diego Garcia, Mauritius, Rodrigues || None || None ||
|-
|  ||  || bgcolor=#| || bgcolor=#| || bgcolor=#| || None || None || None ||
|-
|  ||  || bgcolor=#| || bgcolor=#| || bgcolor=#| || None || None || None ||
|-
|  ||  || bgcolor=#| || bgcolor=#| || bgcolor=#| || Mascarene Islands || Minimal || None ||
|-
| Chedza ||  || bgcolor=#| || bgcolor=#| || bgcolor=#| || Zimbabwe, Malawi, Mozambique, Madagascar, Réunion ||  || 80 || 
|-
| Diamondra ||  || bgcolor=#| || bgcolor=#| || bgcolor=#| || None ||  ||  ||
|-
|  ||  || bgcolor=#| || bgcolor=#| || bgcolor=#| || None ||  ||  ||
|-
|  ||  || bgcolor=#| || bgcolor=#| || bgcolor=#| || Madagascar || Unknown || 5 ||
|-
|  ||  || bgcolor=#| || bgcolor=#| || bgcolor=#| || None ||  ||  ||
|-
|  ||  || bgcolor=#| || bgcolor=#| || bgcolor=#| || Mozambique, Madagascar ||  ||  ||
|-
| Haliba ||  || bgcolor=#| || bgcolor=#| || bgcolor=#| || Madagascar, Réunion, Mauritius ||  ||  ||
|-
|  ||  || bgcolor=#| || bgcolor=#| || bgcolor=#| || None ||  ||  ||
|-
|  ||  || bgcolor=#| || bgcolor=#| || bgcolor=#| || None ||  ||  ||
|-

See also 

 Tropical cyclones in 2014 and 2015
List of Southern Hemisphere tropical cyclone seasons
Atlantic hurricane seasons: 2014, 2015
Pacific hurricane seasons: 2014, 2015
Pacific typhoon seasons: 2014, 2015
North Indian Ocean cyclone seasons: 2014, 2015
2014–15 Australian region cyclone season
2014–15 South Pacific cyclone season
South Atlantic tropical cyclone

References

External links

 Météo-France La Réunion 
 Joint Typhoon Warning Center (JTWC) 

 
South-West Indian Ocean cyclone seasons
2014 SWIO
2015 SWIO